Pauline Boty (6 March 1938 – 1 July 1966) was a British painter and co-founder of the 1960s' British Pop art movement of which she was the only acknowledged female member. Boty's paintings and collages often demonstrate a joy in self-assured femininity and female sexuality, as well as criticism (both overt and implicit) of the "man's world" in which she lived. Her rebellious art, combined with her free-spirited lifestyle, has made Boty a herald of 1970s' feminism.

Life and works

Early life and education
Pauline Veronica Boty was born in Carshalton, Surrey, in 1938 into a middle-class Catholic family.  The youngest of four children, she had three older brothers and a stern father who made her keenly aware of her position as a girl. In 1954 she won a scholarship to the Wimbledon School of Art, which she attended despite her father's disapproval. Boty's mother, on the other hand, was supportive, having herself been a frustrated artist and denied parental permission to attend the Slade School of Fine Art. Boty earned an Intermediate diploma in lithography (1956) and a National Diploma in Design in stained glass (1958). Her schoolmates called her "The Wimbledon Bardot" on account of her resemblance to the French film star Brigitte Bardot. Encouraged by her tutor Charles Carey to explore collage techniques, Boty's painting became more experimental. Her work showed an interest in popular culture early on. In 1957 one of her pieces was shown at the Young Contemporaries exhibition alongside work by Robyn Denny, Richard Smith and Bridget Riley.

She studied at the School of Stained Glass at the Royal College of Art (1958–61). She had wanted to attend the School of Painting, but was dissuaded from applying as admission rates for women were much lower in that department. Despite the institutionalised sexism at her college, Boty was one of the stronger students in her class, and in 1960 one of her stained-glass works was included in the travelling exhibition Modern Stained Glass organised by the Arts Council. Boty continued to paint on her own in her student flat in west London and in 1959 she had three more works selected for the Young Contemporaries exhibition. During this time she also became friends with other emerging Pop artists, such as David Hockney, Derek Boshier, Peter Phillips and Peter Blake.

While at the Royal College of Art, Boty engaged in a number of extracurricular activities. She sang, danced, and acted in risqué college reviews, published her poetry in an alternative student magazine, and was a knowledgeable presence in the film society where she developed her interest, especially in European new wave cinema. She was also an active participant in Anti-Ugly Action, a group of RCA students involved in the stained glass, and later architecture, courses who protested against new British architecture that they considered offensive and of poor quality.

Career
Boty was at her most productive two years after graduating from college. She developed a signature Pop style and iconography. Her first group show, "Blake, Boty, Porter, Reeve" was held in November 1961 at A.I.A. Gallery in London and was hailed as one of the first British Pop art shows. She exhibited twenty collages, including Is it a bird, is it a plane? and a rose is a rose is a rose, which demonstrated her interest in drawing from both high and low popular culture sources in her art (the first title references the Superman comic, the second quotes the American expatriate poet Gertrude Stein).

The following spring Boty, Peter Blake, Derek Boshier and Peter Phillips were featured in Ken Russell's BBC Monitor documentary film Pop Goes the Easel, which was aired on 22 March 1962.

Boty's appearance in Pop Goes the Easel marked the beginning of her brief acting career. She landed roles in an Armchair Theatre play for ITV ("North City Traffic Straight Ahead", 1962) and an episode of the BBC series Maigret ("Peter the Lett", 1963). She also appeared on stage in Frank Hilton's comedy Day of the Prince at the Royal Court, and in Riccardo Aragno's (from the novel by Anthony Powell) Afternoon Men at the New Arts Theatre. (Boty, a regular on the club scene in London, was also a dancer on Ready Steady Go!). Although acting was lucrative, it was a distraction from painting, which remained her main priority. Yet the men in her life encouraged her to pursue acting, as it was a more conventional career choice for women in the early 1960s. The popular press picked up on her glamorous actress persona, often undermining her legitimacy as an artist by referring to her physical appearance. Scene ran a front-page article in November 1962 that included the following remarks: "Actresses often have tiny brains. Painters often have large beards. Imagine a brainy actress who is also a painter and also a blonde, and you have Pauline Boty."

Her unique position as Britain's only female Pop artist gave Boty the chance to redress sexism in her life as well as her art. Her early paintings were sensual and erotic, celebrating female sexuality from a woman's point of view. Her canvases were set against vivid, colourful backgrounds and often included close-ups of red flowers, presumably symbolic of the female sex. She painted her male idols—Elvis, French actor Jean-Paul Belmondo, British writer Derek Marlowe—as sex symbols, just as she did actresses Monica Vitti and Marilyn Monroe. Like Andy Warhol, she recycled publicity and press photographs of celebrities in her art. Her 1963 portrait of her friend Celia Birtwell, Celia and Her Heroes, shows the textile designer surrounded by a Peter Blake painting, a David Hockney portrait and an image of Elvis Presley. She exhibited in several more group shows before staging her first solo exhibition at Grabowski Gallery in the autumn of 1963. The show was a critical success. Boty continued to take on additional acting jobs. She was a presenter on the radio programme Public Ear in 1963–64, and in the following year, she was typecast yet again in the role of 'the seductive Maria' in a BBC serial.

In June 1963 she married the literary agent Clive Goodwin (1932–1978) after a ten-day romance. Her marriage disappointed others such as Peter Blake and her married lover, the television director Philip Saville, whom she had met towards the end of her student days and had worked for. (Their affair is said to have provided the material for a screenplay by Frederic Raphael for the movie Darling (1965).) Boty and Goodwin's Cromwell Road flat became a central hang-out for many artists, musicians, and writers, including Bob Dylan (whom Boty brought to England), David Hockney, Peter Blake, Michael White, Kenneth Tynan, Troy Kennedy Martin, John McGrath, Dennis Potter and Roger McGough. Goodwin, to be later a member of the founding editorial team of the radical journal Black Dwarf, is said to have encouraged Boty to include political content in her paintings.

Her paintings did become more overtly critical over time. Countdown to Violence depicts a number of harrowing current events, including the Birmingham riot of 1963, the Assassination of John F. Kennedy and the Vietnam War. Cuba Si (1963) references the Cuban revolution. The collage painting It's a Man's World I (1964) juxtaposes images of patriarchal icons The Beatles, Albert Einstein, Lenin, Muhammad Ali, Marcel Proust and other men. In It's a Man's World II (1965–66) she redisplayed female nudes from fine art and soft-core pornographic sources to signify newly liberated "female eroticism". Her last known painting, BUM, was commissioned by Kenneth Tynan for Oh, Calcutta! and was completed in 1966.

Death
In June 1965 Boty became pregnant. During a prenatal exam, a tumour was discovered and she was diagnosed with cancer (malignant Thymoma). She refused to have an abortion and also refused to receive chemotherapy treatment that might have harmed the foetus. Instead she smoked marijuana to ease the pain of her terminal condition. She continued to entertain her friends and even sketched The Rolling Stones during her illness. Her daughter, Katy (later Boty) Goodwin, was born on 12 February 1966. Pauline Boty died at the Royal Marsden Hospital on 1 July that year. She was 28 years old. Her daughter, Boty Goodwin, died of an overdose on 12 November 1995 aged 29.

Legacy
After her death, Pauline Boty's paintings were stored away in a barn on her brother's farm and she was largely forgotten for nearly 30 years. Her work was rediscovered in the 1990s, renewing interest in her contribution to Pop art, and gaining her inclusion in several group exhibitions and a major solo retrospective.  the location of some of her most sought after paintings is unknown.

In December 2013, Adrian Hamilton wrote in The Independent on Sunday, "Ignored for decades after her death – it was nearly 30 years before her first picture was shown – a proper retrospective has had to wait until this year with a show which originated in Wolverhampton and has now opened in the Pallant Gallery in Chichester. Looking at her pictures today, it is simply incredible that it has taken so long. [...] It's not a big exhibition. Given the paucity of her surviving work, it could not be otherwise. But it is one which leaves you eager for more, more of the pictures she did paint and the ones she didn't live long enough for."

Boty's life and work also form a major theme in Ali Smith's 2016 novel, Autumn.

In November 2019, the New York Times profiled Boty in their Overlooked No More series: "Pauline Boty, Rebellious Pop Artist".

Exhibitions
  (shown 2021 at Kunsthalle Kiel and 2022 at Kunsthaus Graz)
2013 retrospective exhibition of her work opened at Wolverhampton Art Gallery
  (cooperation with Wolverhampton Art Gallery)
2013 retrospective exhibition of her work opened at Wolverhampton Art Gallery
2013-14 Pallant House Gallery, Chichester, West Sussex

Permanent collections
Smithsonian American Art Museum
Tate Museum, London
National Portrait Gallery, London

Filmography

Film
 

TV

References

Bibliography
 Sue Tate Pauline Boty: Pop Artist and Woman (life and works) Wolverhampton Art Gallery with the Paul Mellon Foundation, 2013
 
 
Adam Smith, Now You See Her: Pauline Boty, First Lady of British Pop, 2002
  
  
  
 Sid Sachs and Kalliopi Minioudaki, eds. Seductive Subversion: Women Pop Artists, 1958–1968. [exhibition catalogue] University of the Arts, Philadelphia. New York and London: Abbeville Press, 2010
 
 Lawrence van Gelder, "Eye-Catchers", The New York Times. 26 March 2002

External links

Pauline Boty in the National Portrait Gallery, London
 (Michael Bracewell on The Only Blonde in the World (1963) by Pauline Boty)

1938 births
1966 deaths
20th-century English painters
20th-century English women artists
Alumni of the Royal College of Art
Alumni of Wimbledon College of Arts
British erotic artists
British pop artists
Deaths from cancer in England
English contemporary artists
English women painters
People educated at Wallington High School for Girls
People from Carshalton